George Campbell (born June 22, 2001) is an American professional soccer player who plays as a center-back for Major League Soccer club CF Montréal.

Career
Born in Chester, Pennsylvania, Campbell played for Nether United as a kid before his family relocated to Atlanta. He began his career with Georgia United before joining the youth academy at Atlanta United. On March 9, 2019, after impressing with the academy, Campbell made his professional debut for Atlanta United 2, the club's reserve side in the USL Championship, against Hartford Athletic. He started as Atlanta United 2 won 2–0. Campbell then scored his first goal for Atlanta United 2 on September 25 against Indy Eleven, scoring the first in a 2–1 victory.

On July 9, 2019, Campbell signed a homegrown player deal with the Atlanta United first team, effective starting from the 2020 season. He made his debut for Atlanta United on March 7 against FC Cincinnati, coming on as a 44th minute substitute in a 2–1 victory.

On December 13, 2022, Campbell was traded to CF Montréal in exchange for $400,000 in 2023 General Allocation Money and $200,000 in 2024 General Allocation Money, as well as up to $300,000 in conditional General Allocation Money.

Career statistics

Club

References

External links
 Profile at Atlanta United

2001 births
Living people
People from Chester, Pennsylvania
American soccer players
Association football defenders
Atlanta United 2 players
Atlanta United FC players
CF Montréal players
USL Championship players
Major League Soccer players
Soccer players from Pennsylvania
Homegrown Players (MLS)